Louis-Hébert is a provincial electoral district in the Capitale-Nationale region of Quebec, Canada. It consists of part of the Sainte-Foy–Sillery–Cap-Rouge borough of Quebec City (specifically the neighbourhoods of Cap-Rouge, Champigny, Jouvence, Quartier Laurentien, Lorette, Les Grands-Déserts and parts of Pointe-de-Sainte-Foy and Place-Notre-Dame), as well as all of Saint-Augustin-de-Desmaures.

It was created for the 1966 election from parts of Québec-Comté and Québec-Ouest and a small part of Portneuf electoral districts.

In the change from the 2001 to the 2011 electoral map, it gained Saint-Augustin-de-Desmaures from La Peltrie; it also gained part of Quebec City from La Peltrie, but lost part of the city to Jean-Talon.

The riding was named after the first legal farmer of New France, Louis Hébert.

Members of the Legislative Assembly / National Assembly

Election results

^ Change is from redistributed results. CAQ change is from ADQ.

References

External links
Information
 Elections Quebec

Election results
 Election results (National Assembly)
 Election results (QuébecPolitique)

Maps
 2011 map (PDF)
 2001 map (Flash)
2001–2011 changes (Flash)
1992–2001 changes (Flash)
 Electoral map of Capitale-Nationale region
 Quebec electoral map, 2011

Provincial electoral districts of Quebec City
Quebec provincial electoral districts